Rice Lake may refer to:

Communities 
 Rice Lake, Minnesota, a city in Saint Louis County
 Rice Lake (CDP), Minnesota, a census-designated place in Clearwater County
 Rice Lake (ghost town), Minnesota, a former village in Dodge and Steele counties
 Rice Lake, Wright County, Minnesota, an unincorporated community
 Rice Lake Township, Ward County, North Dakota
 Rice Lake, Ontario
 Rice Lake, Wisconsin, a city in Barron County
 Rice Lake (town), Wisconsin, a town adjacent to the medium-sized city

Lakes

Canada 
 Rice Lake (Ontario), a lake located in Northumberland and Peterborough counties in south-eastern Ontario

United States 
 Rice Lake (Illinois), site of the island Miserable
 Rice Lake (Cook County, Minnesota)
 Rice Lake (Dodge County, Minnesota), a lake in Rice Lake State Park, near Owatonna, Minnesota
 Rice Lake (Hubbard County, Minnesota)
 Rice Lake (Mille Lacs County, Minnesota)
 Rice Lake (Pope County, Minnesota)
 Rice Lake (Rice County, Minnesota)
 Rice Lake (Wadena County, Minnesota)
 Rice Lake (Washington County, Minnesota)
 Rice Lake (Barron County, Wisconsin)

Other uses
 Rice Lake National Wildlife Refuge, a wildlife refuge near McGregor, Minnesota
 Rice Lake State Park, a state park of Minnesota, east of Owatonna
 Rice Lake Band of Mississippi Chippewa, now part of the Mille Lacs Band of Ojibwe in east-central Minnesota
 Rice Lake (VIA station)
 Rice Lake, Dallas and Menomonie Railway, a railroad company based in Wisconsin.

See also 
 Rice (disambiguation)